The 2010 United States House of Representatives elections were held on November 2, 2010, as part of the 2010 midterm elections during President Barack Obama's first term in office. Voters of the 50 U.S. states chose 435 U.S. Representatives to serve in the 112th United States Congress. Also, voters of the U.S. territories, commonwealths and District of Columbia chose their non-voting delegates. U.S. Senate elections and various state and local elections were held on the same date.

Republicans regained control of the U.S. House they had lost in the 2006 midterm election, picking up a net total of 63 seats and erasing the gains Democrats made in 2006 and 2008. Although the sitting President's party usually loses seats in a midterm election, the 2010 election resulted in the highest losses by a party in a House midterm election since 1938, as well as the largest House swing since 1948.

Republicans made their largest gain in House seats since 1938. Three Democratic committee chairmen were defeated: transportation chairman Jim Oberstar of Minnesota, armed services chairman Ike Skelton of Missouri, and budget chairman John Spratt of South Carolina. Democrats made three pick-ups, winning an open seat in Delaware and defeating Republican incumbents in Hawaii and Louisiana.

The heavy Democratic Party losses in 2010 were attributed to anger at President Obama, opposition to the Affordable Care Act and American Recovery and Reinvestment Act, large budget deficits, and the weak economy.

Background

Following the 2006 elections, Democrats took control of the House as well as the Senate. In the 2008 elections, which coincided with Democrat Barack Obama's victory over Republican John McCain for the presidency, Democrats increased their majorities in both chambers. Of the 435 congressional districts, 242 were carried by Obama, while 193 voted for McCain. Of the districts Obama won, 34 elected a Republican to the House, while 49 of the districts McCain won elected a Democrat.

Republican gains
The Republicans' 63-seat pickup in the House to take control of that chamber, as well as their gain of six Senate seats, signified a dramatic rollback of recent Democratic gains. In the election, Republicans won their greatest number of House seats since 1946. This has been attributed to the continued economic recession, as well as President Obama's controversial stimulus and health care reform bills. Republicans also took control of 29 of the 50 state governorships and gained 690 seats in state legislatures, to hold their greatest number since the 1928 elections.

Republicans also made historic gains in state legislatures, adding more than 675 state legislative seats, by far surpassing their state-legislative gains in 1994. Republicans gained control of dozens of state legislative chambers, and took control of "seven more legislatures outright than they did after 1994 and the most since 1952." Republicans picked up control of the Alabama Legislature for the first time since Reconstruction; control of the North Carolina Senate for the first time since 1870; and control of the Minnesota Senate for the first time since the state returned to partisan elections in 1974.

The Great Lakes region, which until then had recently favored the Democratic Party, went strongly Republican. In California and the Pacific Northwest, however, the Democrats retained the upper hand. The biggest change in 2010 occurred in the Southeastern United States, which had previously been roughly evenly split between Democrats and Republicans for everything except for president. Just one white Democrat from the Deep South won reelection to the US House in 2010. Prior to 2010, many white conservative southerners had voted Republican for president, but Democratic for other offices.

Results summary

Federal 

Sources: House Clerk – Statistics of the Congressional Election, 2010

Voter demographics

Source: CNN exit poll

Retiring incumbents
37 incumbents retired.

Democrats
17 incumbent Democrats retired.
 : Artur Davis: To run for Governor of Alabama.
 : Marion Berry: Retired due to health concerns.
 : Vic Snyder: Retired to spend more time with family.
 : Diane Watson: Retired; "It should be a seat inherited by someone who can represent everyone in this district."
 : Kendrick Meek: To run for U.S. Senator.
 : Brad Ellsworth: To run for U.S. Senator.
 : Dennis Moore: Retired; "Time for a new generation of leadership."
 : Charlie Melançon: To run for U.S. Senator.
 : Bill Delahunt: Retired; "Life is about change. I think it's healthy. It's time."
 : Bart Stupak: Retired; "I've accomplished what I want to do."
 : Paul Hodes: To run for U.S. Senator.
 : Joe Sestak: To run for U.S. Senator.
 : Patrick J. Kennedy: Retired to "[take] a new direction."
 : Bart Gordon: Retired; "…it's time for a new chapter."
 : John S. Tanner: Retired; decided 20 years was long enough.
 : Brian Baird: Retired, to pursue other options.
 : Dave Obey: Retired; "But even more frankly, I am bone tired." Media reports indicated Obey's future plans included joining a DC lobbying firm run by former Representative Dick Gephardt.

Republicans
19 incumbent Republicans retired.
 : John Boozman: to run for U.S. Senator.
 : John Shadegg: to pursue other interests.
 : George Radanovich: to put family obligations first.
 : Mike Castle: to run for U.S. Senator.
 : Ginny Brown-Waite: due to health issues.
 : Adam Putnam: to run for Florida Commissioner of Agriculture.
 : Lincoln Díaz-Balart: to return to law practice.
 : John Linder
 : Mark Kirk: to run for U.S. Senator.
 : Steve Buyer: due to wife's illness
 : Jerry Moran: to run for U.S. Senator.
 : Todd Tiahrt: to run for U.S. Senator.
 : Pete Hoekstra: to run for Governor of Michigan.
 : Vern Ehlers
 : Roy Blunt: to run for U.S. Senator.
 : Mary Fallin: to run for Governor of Oklahoma.
 : Henry E. Brown Jr.: to spend more time with his family.
 : Gresham Barrett: to run for Governor of South Carolina.
 : Zach Wamp: to run for Governor of Tennessee.

Incumbents defeated
There were nine Democrats who survived reelection in the 1994 Republican Revolution, but were defeated this year.

Lost renomination

Democrats 
Two Democrats lost renomination. One seat was held by Democrats, while the other flipped to Republicans.
 : Carolyn Cheeks Kilpatrick lost to Hansen Clarke.
 : Alan Mollohan lost to Mike Oliverio, who subsequently lost in the general election to Republican David McKinley.

Republicans 
Two Republicans lost renomination. Both seats were eventually held by Republicans.
 : Parker Griffith (first elected in 2008 as a Democrat; switched parties in 2009) lost to Mo Brooks.
 : Bob Inglis lost to Trey Gowdy.

Lost re-election 
Fifty-four incumbents lost in the general election; all but two were Democrats. Many of the Democrats who lost had been initially elected in the Democratic wave years of 2006 and 2008, and several others were longtime incumbents from the southeast.

Democrats 
52 Democrats lost re-election.
 , Bobby Bright (first elected in 2008) lost to Martha Roby
 , Ann Kirkpatrick (first elected in 2008) lost to Paul Gosar
 , Harry Mitchell (first elected in 2006) lost to David Schweikert
 , John Salazar (first elected in 2004) lost to Scott Tipton
 , Betsy Markey (first elected in 2008) lost to Cory Gardner
 , Allen Boyd (first elected in 1996) lost to Steve Southerland
 , Alan Grayson (first elected in 2008) lost to Daniel Webster
 , Ron Klein (first elected in 2006) lost to Allen West
 , Suzanne Kosmas (first elected in 2008) lost to Sandy Adams
 , Jim Marshall (first elected in 2002) lost to Austin Scott
 , Walt Minnick (first elected in 2008) lost to Raúl Labrador
 , Melissa Bean (first elected in 2004) lost to Joe Walsh
 , Debbie Halvorson (first elected in 2008) lost to Adam Kinzinger
 , Bill Foster (first elected in 2008) lost to Randy Hultgren
 , Phil Hare (first elected in 2006) lost to Bobby Schilling
 , Baron Hill (originally elected in 1998) lost to Todd Young
 , Frank Kratovil (first elected in 2008) lost to Andrew P. Harris
 , Mark Schauer (first elected in 2008) lost to Tim Walberg
 , Jim Oberstar (first elected in 1974) lost to Chip Cravaack
 , Travis Childers (first elected in 2008) lost to Alan Nunnelee
 , Gene Taylor (first elected in 1989) lost to Steven Palazzo
 , Ike Skelton (first elected in 1976) lost to Vicky Hartzler
 , Dina Titus (first elected in 2008) lost to Joe Heck
 , Carol Shea-Porter (first elected in 2006) lost to Frank Guinta
 , John Adler (first elected in 2008) lost to Jon Runyan
 , Harry Teague (first elected in 2008) lost to Steve Pearce
 , Michael McMahon (first elected in 2008) lost to Michael Grimm
 , John Hall (first elected in 2006) lost to Nan Hayworth
 , Scott Murphy (first elected in 2009) lost to Chris Gibson
 , Mike Arcuri (first elected in 2006) lost to Richard L. Hanna
 , Dan Maffei (first elected in 2008) lost to Ann Marie Buerkle
 , Bob Etheridge (first elected in 1996) lost to Renee Ellmers
 , Earl Pomeroy (first elected in 1992) lost to Rick Berg
 , Steve Driehaus (first elected in 2008) lost to Steve Chabot
 , Charlie Wilson (first elected in 2006) lost to Bill Johnson
 , Mary Jo Kilroy (first elected in 2008) lost to Steve Stivers
 , John Boccieri (first elected in 2008) lost to Jim Renacci
 , Zack Space (first elected in 2006) lost to Bob Gibbs
 , Kathy Dahlkemper (first elected in 2008) lost to Mike Kelly
 , Patrick Murphy (first elected in 2006) lost to Mike Fitzpatrick
 , Chris Carney (first elected in 2006) lost to Tom Marino
 , Paul E. Kanjorski (first elected in 1984) lost to Lou Barletta
 , John Spratt (first elected in 1982) lost to Mick Mulvaney
 , Stephanie Herseth Sandlin (first elected in 2004) lost to Kristi Noem
 , Lincoln Davis (first elected in 2002) lost to Scott DesJarlais
 , Chet Edwards (first elected in 1990) lost to Bill Flores
 , Ciro Rodriguez (originally elected in 1996) lost to Quico Canseco
 , Solomon P. Ortiz (first elected in 1982) lost to Blake Farenthold
 , Glenn Nye (first elected in 2008) lost to Scott Rigell
 , Tom Perriello (first elected in 2008) lost to Robert Hurt
 , Rick Boucher (first elected in 1982) lost to Morgan Griffith
 , Steve Kagen (first elected in 2006) lost to Reid Ribble

Republicans 
Two Republicans lost re-election.
 , Charles Djou (first elected in 2010) lost to Colleen Hanabusa
 , Joseph Cao (first elected in 2008) lost to Cedric Richmond

Open seats that changed parties

Democratic seats won by Republicans 
Fourteen open seats, held by Democrats, were won by Republicans.
 : Won by Rick Crawford
 : Won by Tim Griffin
 : Won by Larry Bucshon
 : Won by Kevin Yoder
 : Won by Jeff Landry
 : Won by Dan Benishek
 : Won by Charles Bass
 : Won by Tom Reed
 : Won by Pat Meehan
 : Won by Diane Black
 : Won by Stephen Fincher
 : Won by Jaime Herrera Beutler
 : Won by David McKinley
 : Won by Sean Duffy

Republican seats won by Democrats 
One open seat, held by a Republican, was won by a Democrat.
 : Won by John Carney

Closest races 
Eighty-four races were decided by 10% or lower.

Election ratings

Special elections 

There were six special elections in 2010 to the 111th United States Congress, listed here by date and district.

|-
! 
| Robert Wexler
| 
| 1996
|  | Incumbent resigned January 3, 2010 to become Director of the Center for Middle East Peace.New member elected April 13, 2010.Democratic hold.
| nowrap | 

|-
! 
| John Murtha
| 
| 1974 
|  | Incumbent died February 8, 2010, due to surgery complications.New member elected May 18, 2010.Democratic hold.
| nowrap | 

|-
! 
| Neil Abercrombie
| 
| 1990
|  | Incumbent resigned February 28, 2010 to run for Governor of Hawaii.New member elected May 22, 2010.Republican gain.
| nowrap | 

|-
! 
| Nathan Deal
| 
| 1992
|  | Incumbent resigned March 21, 2010 to run for Governor of Georgia.New member elected June 8, 2010.Republican hold.
| nowrap | 

|-
! 
| Mark Souder
| 
| 1994
|  | Incumbent resigned May 21, 2010 amid affair scandal.New member elected November 2, 2010.Republican hold.
| nowrap | 

|-
! 
| Eric Massa
| 
| 2008
|  | Incumbent resigned March 8, 2010 following sexual misconduct allegations.New member elected November 2, 2010.Republican gain.
| nowrap | 

|}

Alabama

Alaska

Arizona

Arkansas

California

Colorado

Connecticut

Delaware

Florida

Georgia

Hawaii

Idaho

Illinois

Indiana

Iowa

Kansas

Kentucky

Louisiana

Maine

Maryland

Massachusetts

Michigan

Minnesota

Mississippi

Missouri

Montana

Nebraska

Nevada

New Hampshire

New Jersey

New Mexico

New York

North Carolina

North Dakota

Ohio

Oklahoma

Oregon

Pennsylvania

Rhode Island

South Carolina

South Dakota

Tennessee

Texas

Utah

Vermont

Virginia

Washington

West Virginia

Wisconsin 

|-
! 
| 
| 
| 
| 1998
| Incumbent re-elected.
| nowrap | 

|-
! 
| 
| 
| 
| 1998
| Incumbent re-elected.
| nowrap | 

|-
! 
| 
| 
| 
| 1996
| Incumbent re-elected.
| nowrap | 

|-
! 
| 
| 
| 
| 2004
| Incumbent re-elected.
| nowrap | 

|-
! 
| 
| 
| 
| 1978
| Incumbent re-elected.
| nowrap | 

|-
! 
| 
| 
| 
| 1979 
| Incumbent re-elected.
| nowrap | 

|-
! 
| 
| 
| 
| 1969 
|  | Incumbent retired.New member elected.Republican gain.
| nowrap | 

|-
! 
| 
| 
| 
| 2006
|  | Incumbent lost reelection.New member elected.Republican gain.
| nowrap | 

|}

Wyoming

Non-voting delegates 

The House of Representatives includes five Delegates from the District of Columbia and outlying territories elected to two-year terms and one Resident Commissioner of Puerto Rico elected to a four-year term (for which the last election was held in 2008, so the seat was not up for reelection in 2010). These delegates are not allowed to vote on the floor of the House of Representatives.

See also
 2010 United States elections
 2010 United States gubernatorial elections
 2010 United States Senate elections
 111th United States Congress
 112th United States Congress

Notes

References

Further reading
 Abramson, Paul R. John H Aldrich and David W Rohde, Change and Continuity in the 2008 and 2010 Elections (2011)
 Bullock, Charles S., III et al.  Key States, High Stakes: Sarah Palin, the Tea Party, and the 2010 Elections (2011) excerpt and text search

External links
 Candidates for U.S. Congress at Project Vote Smart
 U.S. House of Representatives from OurCampaigns.com
 Congressional Races in 2010 from Open Secrets (campaign contributions)
 2010 National Congressional Ballot from Pollster.com
 Election 2010: House of Representatives Election from Rasmussen Reports
 Battle for the House from Real Clear Politics
 House Races in 2010 from CQ Politics
 A Look at 2010 Congressional Races at C-SPAN, ongoing video blog